Oumar Samba Sy (born 8 December 1959) is a Mauritanian freestyle and Greco-Roman wrestler

Sy competed for Mauritania in two Olympics, first at the 1984 Summer Olympics where he competed in the 100 kg freestyle, he lost his first group match then withdrew from the competition, four years later at the 1988 Summer Olympics he entered the 100 kg Greco-Roman, he won his first group match with a fall against Maisiba Obwoge from Kenya in under two minutes, he then lost his next match and again withdrew from the competition.

References

External links
 

1959 births
Living people
Olympic wrestlers of Mauritania
Wrestlers at the 1984 Summer Olympics
Wrestlers at the 1988 Summer Olympics
Mauritanian male sport wrestlers